Narendranath Mitra (30 January 1916 – 14 September 1975) was an Indian writer and poet, best known for his short stories in the Bengali-language. Several of his works have been adapted into films, such as Mahanagar directed by Satyajit Ray.

Biography
Narendranath Mitra was born in Sadardi village, Faridpur, Bengal Presidency (in modern-day Bangladesh). His father was a lawyer's clerk. His mother died when he was very young and he was brought up by his stepmother.  He was based in Kolkata, now in India at the time of partition in 1947, and chose to remain in India when his birthplace fell to the share of East Pakistan.

In 1933, he passed S. S. C. Level from Vanga High School obtaining first division marks. After doing his I. A. from Rajendra College, Faridpur, he went to Calcutta for further studies. He completed his B. A. from Bangabasi College, of the University of Calcutta.

He found employment at the Dum Dum ordnance factory in Kolkata during the Second World War. After that, he joined Kolkata National Bank. Later, his family was living in Kolkata.

He was a journalist, editor; worked for 'Krishok', 'Swaraj' 'Satyajug'. From 1951 until his death in 1975, he was with Anandabazar Patrika.

Works adaptations
His story Abataranika  was adapted into Mahanagar (The Big City) by Satyajit Ray in 1964, with Madhabi Mukherjee as lead. Ras(রস) was adapted into the Hindi film, Saudagar (1973), by Sudhendu Roy, starring Amitabh Bachchan and Nutan; and a  Bangladeshi film Poush Maser Pirit by Nargis Akhter, starring Ahmed Rubel and Sadika Parvin Popy. In 1970, Bengali film Bilambita Lay and in 1975 Palanka were released based on his short story. 1988 Bengali film, Phera by Buddhadeb Dasgupta, was also adapted from his story.

Bibliography
Deeppunjo
Osomotol
Holde Bari
Dehomon
Durvashini
Rupmonjori
Ultoroth
Sukh Dukher Dheu
Suklapakhya
Chenamahal
Chorai Utrai
Okhore Okhore
Jatrapath
Misrarag
Headmaster
Mohanagar
Chilekotha
Shandhyarag
Surjasakkhi
Sreshtha Golpo
Tin Din Tin Ratri
Suryasakshi
Godhuli
Chhatri
Debjan
Bilambitalay

References

External links
 
 
 Narendranath Mitra at the West Bengal Public Library Network

Bengali-language writers
Bengali male poets
Bengali-language poets
20th-century Bengali poets
1916 births
1975 deaths
Bengali Hindus
Bengali writers
20th-century Bengalis
People from Faridpur District
Bangabasi College alumni
University of Calcutta alumni
Writers from Kolkata
Novelists from West Bengal
Bengali novelists
Indian poets
Indian male poets
20th-century Indian poets
Poets from West Bengal
Indian male writers
20th-century Indian writers
20th-century Indian male writers
Indian short story writers
Indian male short story writers
20th-century Indian short story writers
Indian journalists
Indian male journalists
Indian newspaper journalists
20th-century Indian journalists
Indian novelists
Indian male novelists
Indian editors
Indian newspaper editors